<< List of Vanity Fair caricatures (1880–1884) >> List of Vanity Fair caricatures (1890–1894)

The following is from a list of caricatures  published 1885–1889 by the British magazine Vanity Fair (1868–1914).

Next List of Vanity Fair (British magazine) caricatures (1890-1894)

 
1880s in the United Kingdom